HackerRank is a technology company that focuses on competitive programming challenges for both consumers and businesses. Developers compete by writing programs according to provided specifications. HackerRank's programming challenges can be solved in a variety of programming languages (including Java, C++, PHP, Python, SQL, JavaScript) and span multiple computer science domains.

HackerRank categorizes most of their programming challenges into a number of core computer science domains, including the management of databases, mathematics, artificial intelligence, among other subjects.

When a programmer submits a solution to a programming challenge, their submission is scored on the accuracy of their output. Programmers are then ranked globally on the HackerRank leaderboard and earn badges based on their accomplishments, which is intended to drive competition among users. In addition to individual coding challenges, HackerRank also hosts contests (often referred to by HackerRank as "CodeSprints") where users compete on the same programming challenges during a set period of time and are then ranked at the conclusion of the event. HackerRank is part of the growing gamification trend within competitive computer programming. The consumer-side of their website is free for coders to use.

History 
HackerRank was founded as InterviewStreet Inc. by two NIT Trichy alumni Vivek Ravisankar and Hari Karunanidhi. HackerRank is a Y Combinator-backed company, and was the first Indian company accepted into Y Combinator. They also participated in TechCrunch Disrupt in 2012, and currently have venture capital backing from Khosla Ventures and Battery Ventures.

Funding 
In July 2015, HackerRank received $7.5 million funding from a Japanese firm Recruit Holdings’ HR technology fund. On February 13, 2018 HackerRank announced they had raised $30 million in Series C funding, led by JMI Equity.

Acquisition 
In December 2019, HackerRank acquired Mimir, a cloud-based service that provides tools for teaching computer science courses. Mimir is used by Google and some universities including Michigan State, UCLA, Oregon State and Purdue. Mimir is HackerRank’s first acquisition.

HackerRank for Work 
Their enterprise-side product, HackerRank for Work, is a subscription service that aims to help companies source, screen, and hire engineers and other technical roles. The product is intended to allow technical recruiters to use programming challenges to test candidates on their specific programming skills and better understand their qualification for a certain role. Candidate's challenges, once submitted, are auto-scored and the results are then provided to the technical recruiter for review. In addition to screening, HackerRank also hosts programming hackathons, referred to as CodeSprints, as a way for companies to source technical candidates. HackerRank’s customers include Yahoo!, Quora, and Amazon.

See also 
 CodeChef
 HackerEarth
 CodeFights
 Codeforces
 CodinGame
 Topcoder
 Codewars

References

External links 
 HackerRank

Programming contests